Chisholm is a city in St. Louis County, Minnesota, United States.  The population was 4,976 at the 2010 census. The city has been called "The Heart of the Iron Range" due to its location in the middle of the Mesabi Iron Range.

History
The city was named for its founder, Archibald Mark Chisholm (1862–1933), a mining man and investor from Glengarry County, Ontario, Canada. Chisholm was incorporated in 1901. A post office called Chisholm has been in operation since 1901. With a railroad line to Duluth and plenty of mining work available in and near town, Chisholm's population grew rapidly, and by 1908 it had more than 6,000 people and 500 buildings. On September 5, 1908, a fast-moving forest fire obliterated the town due to dry conditions and the wooden construction of nearly all the town's buildings. Many people escaped by going into the lake. No one died in the fire. Afterward, building codes were enhanced, and by the next summer more than 70 fireproof buildings had been erected.

Chisholm became a city in 1934. Muralist Elizabeth Carney Pope completed a WPA mural, Discovery of Ore, in the Chisholm post office in 1941.

Geography

Chisholm is in the center of the Mesabi Iron Range, one of the four iron ranges in Minnesota's Arrowhead Region.

U.S. Highway 169 and State Highway 73 (MN 73) are two of Chisholm's main routes.

Demographics

2010 census
As of the census of 2010, there were 4,976 people, 2,257 households, and 1,260 families living in the city. The racial makeup of the city was 95.5% White, 0.8% African American, 1.1% Native American, 0.3% Asian, 0.1% from other races, and 2.2% from two or more races. Hispanic or Latino of any race were 1.4% of the population.

There were 2,256 households, of which 27.0% had children under the age of 18 living with them, 38.9% were married couples living together, 11.6% had a female householder with no husband present, 5.4% had a male householder with no wife present, and 44.1% were non-families. 39.0% of all households were made up of individuals, and 14.8% had someone living alone who was 65 years of age or older. The average household size was 2.15 and the average family size was 2.81.

The median age in the city was 40.7 years. 22.3% of residents were under the age of 18; 7.4% were between the ages of 18 and 24; 24.7% were from 25 to 44; 27.6% were from 45 to 64; and 18% were 65 years of age or older. The gender makeup of the city was 50.2% male and 49.8% female.

2000 census
As of the 2000 census, there were 4,960 people, 2,178 households, and 1,287 families living in the city. The racial makeup of the city was 97.9% White, 0.1% African American, 0.6% Native American, 0.3% Asian, 0.1% from other races, less than one percent Pacific Islander, and 1% from two or more races. Hispanic or Latino of any race were 0.7% of the population. (Percentages may not add to exactly 100 due to rounding.) 12.8% were of Finnish, 11.9% German, 9.9% Slovene, 8.5% Italian, 8.4% Norwegian, 6.4% Irish and 5.8% French ancestry.

There were 2,178 households, out of which 28% had children under the age of 18 living with them, 44% were married couples living together, 11% had a female householder with no husband present, and 41% were non-families. 37% of all households were made up of individuals, and 20% had someone living alone who was 65 years of age or older.  The average household size was 2.2 and the average family size was 2.9.

In the city, the population was spread out, with 22% under the age of 18, 8% from 18 to 24, 25% from 25 to 44, 23% from 45 to 64, and 22% who were 65 years of age or older.  The median age was 42 years. For every 100 females, there were 92 males.  For every 100 females age 18 and over, there were 87 males.

The median income for a household in the city was $28,472, and the median income for a family was $40,431. Males had a median income of $35,972 versus $21,406 for females. The per capita income for the city was $16,204.  About 6% of families and 12% of the population were below the poverty line, including 14% of those under age 18 and 11% of those age 65 or over.

Education

The Chisholm Independent School District draws students from Chisholm and surrounding Balkan Township. Vaughan–Steffensrud Elementary School (named for the first two superintendents of the Chisholm school system) has classes for children from preschool through third grade, Chisholm Elementary School has students in grades 4 through 6, and Chisholm High School has grades 7 through 12.

Notable people
 John Blatnik, former U.S. Congressman
 Roger Enrico, former CEO of PepsiCo
 Philip Falcone, billionaire Wall Street investor
 Ann Govednik, Olympic breaststroke swimmer
 Archibald "Moonlight" Graham, former Major League Baseball player, town doctor
 Patty Hajdu, Canadian politician
 Ben Hoberman, pioneer of the all-talk radio format
 Richard Kelly, Minnesota state legislator and politician
 Cameron Latu, college tight end 
 Joel Maturi, former University of Minnesota athletic director
 Jim Oberstar, former U.S. Congressman
 Dan Orlich, former NFL defensive end
 Shawn Rojeski, 2006 Winter Olympics men's curling bronze medalist
 Tony Sertich, Minnesota politician and former House majority leader
 John Shuster, 2018 Winter Olympics men's curling gold medalist
 Jason Smith, 2010 Winter Olympics men's curler
 David Tomassoni, Olympic and professional hockey player and former Minnesota State legislator

In popular culture

 In the motion picture Field of Dreams, Ray Kinsella and Terence Mann go to Chisholm to find Archibald "Moonlight" Graham.  Graham, or "Doc" Graham, as the residents of Chisholm called him, did indeed live in Chisholm for 50 years as a doctor following his baseball career. The scenes depicting the town were actually filmed in Galena, Illinois.
 Scenes of the drama film North Country (2005) were filmed in Chisholm.

References

External links

 City of Chisholm, MN – Official Website

1901 establishments in Minnesota
Cities in Minnesota
Cities in St. Louis County, Minnesota
Mining communities in Minnesota
Populated places established in 1901